Berna Laçin (born 20 August 1970) is a Turkish actress and TV presenter.

A graduate of Istanbul State Conservatory with a degree in theatre studies, Laçin has appeared in various TV series such as Gökkuşağı, Böyle mi Olacaktı, Ateş Dansı, Evdeki Yabancı, and Belalı Baldız. She has also been cast in four different movies. Aside from her acting career, Laçin has also worked as a presenter, most notably in 2009 when she hosted the 31st International April 23 National Sovereignty and Children's Day Program. She occasionally presented daily programs, including Her Şey İçin Berna Laçin on ATV in 2010.

Filmography

Theatre 
 The Decorator : Donald Churchill - Tiyatro Martı - 2014
 Couple en turbulences : Éric Assous - Tiyatro İstanbul - 2007
 Chapter Two : Neil Simon - Tiyatro İstanbul - 1997
 La Pelle : Curzio Malaparte - Istanbul City Theatre
 Teope : Çoşkun Büktel - Istanbul City Theatre
 Gözlerimi Kaparım Vazifemi Yaparım : Haldun Taner - Istanbul City Theatre
 Aile Şerefi

References

External links 

 
 

1970 births
People from Karşıyaka
20th-century Turkish actresses
21st-century Turkish actresses
Turkish television actresses
Turkish film actresses
Turkish television presenters
Turkish women television presenters
Living people